Kosht is an administrative unit, known as Union Council, of Chitral District in the Khyber Pakhtunkhwa province of Pakistan.

Chitral is the largest district in the Khyber-Pakhtunkhwa province of Pakistan, covering an area of 14,850 km². It is the northernmost district of Pakistan. The district of Chitral is divided into two tehsils and 24 Union Councils. Sandragh is the center of Kosht with Pakistan Post, shops and having the longest built co-Government High School Sandragh in KPK, Girls Government High school and Brilliance College. Football is the most played game followed by Cricket and then Horse Polo.
Chitral
Mastuj

See also 

 Chitral District

References
https://www.facebook.com/Kosht-Chitral-176467119103910/

External links
Khyber-Pakhtunkhwa Government website section on Lower Dir
United Nations

Chitral District
Tehsils of Chitral District
Union councils of Khyber Pakhtunkhwa
Populated places in Chitral District
Union councils of Chitral District